Cobalt-60 could mean:

Cobalt-60 is a radioactive isotope of cobalt
Cobalt 60 (band) is an electro-industrial band
Cobalt 60 (comic) is a comic series created by Vaughn Bodē
Cobalt 60 was also the original name for the band C60 (band).